The 1973 Minnesota Twins finished 81–81, third in the American League West.

Offseason 
 November 30, 1972: Rich Reese was purchased from the Twins by the Detroit Tigers.
 November 30, 1972: César Tovar was traded by the Twins to the Philadelphia Phillies for Joe Lis, Ken Sanders and Ken Reynolds.

Regular season 
With the American League's new designated hitter rule taking effect, on April 6 in Oakland, California, Tony Oliva became the first DH to hit a home run.

On July 3, Tony Oliva hit three home runs against the Kansas City Royals.  The Twins record feat was accomplished twice before, by both Bob Allison and Harmon Killebrew in 1963.

Two Twins made the All-Star Game: second baseman Rod Carew and pitcher Bert Blyleven. 907,499 fans attended Twins games, the third lowest total in the American League.

On September 27, California Angels pitcher Nolan Ryan struck out sixteen Twins and set a major league season mark of 383 strikeouts.  Minnesota's Rich Reese was Ryan's 383rd victim.

Pitcher Bert Blyleven finished with a 20–17 record and set several team records: total innings pitched (325.0), complete games (25), shutouts (9), and strikeouts (258).

Rod Carew won his third AL batting title with a .350 average. Bobby Darwin continued to show potential as a hitter with 18 home runs and 90 RBI. Tony Oliva limped through the season, hitting 16 HR and collecting 92 RBI. Bert Blyleven won 20 games for the first time, and three other pitchers had double digit wins: Jim Kaat (11–12), Dick Woodson (10–8), and Joe Decker (10–10). Kaat also won his 12th Gold Glove Award.

Season standings

Record vs. opponents

Notable transactions 
 June 5, 1973: Luis Gómez was drafted by the Twins in the 7th round of the 1973 Major League Baseball draft.
 August 15, 1973: Jim Kaat was selected off waivers from the Twins by the Chicago White Sox.
 August 17, 1973: Rich Reese was signed as a free agent by the Twins.

Roster

Player stats

Batting

Starters by position 
Note: Pos = Position; G = Games played; AB = At bats; H = Hits; Avg. = Batting average; HR = Home runs; RBI = Runs batted in

Other batters 
Note: G = Games played; AB = At bats; H = Hits; Avg. = Batting average; HR = Home runs; RBI = Runs batted in

Pitching

Starting pitchers 
Note: G = Games pitched; IP = Innings pitched; W = Wins; L = Losses; ERA = Earned run average; SO = Strikeouts

Other pitchers 
Note: G = Games pitched; IP = Innings pitched; W = Wins; L = Losses; ERA = Earned run average; SO = Strikeouts

Relief pitchers 
Note: G = Games pitched; W = Wins; L = Losses; SV = Saves; ERA = Earned run average; SO = Strikeouts

Farm system 

LEAGUE CHAMPIONS: Wisconsin Rapids

Notes

References 

Player stats from www.baseball-reference.com
Team info from www.baseball-almanac.com

Minnesota Twins seasons
Minnesota Twins season
Minnesota Twins